William Clapham (1722 – 28 May, 1763) was an American military officer who participated in the construction of several forts in Pennsylvania during the French and Indian War. He was considered a competent commander in engagements with French troops and Native American warriors, but towards the end of his military career he was unpopular with troops under his command. Following his retirement from the army, he and his family were killed by Lenape warriors on his farm in 1763.

Early career 

Nothing is known of William Clapham's early life. He was appointed captain in Boston on 1 November, 1747, and may have been born in Massachusetts. He was married to Mary Clapham.

Defamation case, 1747 

Court records for Suffolk County, Massachusetts, show that on 30 June, 1747, Clapham filed charges against William MacLanahan for defamation, claiming that MacLanahan
"did on ye fifteenth of June instant at Boston aforesd in ye hearing of Sundry persons willingly & malisciouly utter these false & scandalous Words, concerning ye Complainant, He (meaning the Complainant) is Lyar & a Cheat  & has cheated his men (meaning the Soldiers under his Command) of their Provisions; He has used them cruelly & beat one them in such a manner as caused his Death."

The outcome of the case is not recorded.

Service in Nova Scotia, 1748–1754 

In 1748, Clapham was sent as a company commander to defend Annapolis Royal as part of a New England reinforcement for Nova Scotia, where he served with Jedidiah Preble and Benjamin Goldthwait.

Clapham was stationed in Nova Scotia during Father Le Loutre's War (1749–1755). On 19 August 1749, Captain Clapham was in command at Canso, Nova Scotia, when Lieutenant Joseph Gorham and his party were attacked by Mi'kmaq who took twenty prisoners and carried them off to Louisbourg. After Governor Edward Cornwallis complained to the Governor of Ile Royale, the prisoners were released.

After the 1749 raid on Dartmouth, Clapham raised a company of 70 men, known as "Clapham's Rangers," to fight the Mi'kmaq. Governor Cornwallis offered £10 for every Mi'kmaq scalp or prisoner. The bounty of scalps was raised to £50 in 1750, motivating Clapham and Francis Bartelo to form new ranger companies to search the land around Halifax for Mi'kmaq. Although fighting continued across the Chignecto Isthmus during 1751, by summer Cornwallis had disbanded all ranger companies except Gorham's.

Clapham relieved John Gorham in the Battle at St. Croix on 23 March, 1750, by arriving at Pisiguit with his company of rangers and two field pieces, forcing the Mi'kmaq to withdraw. Clapham fought in the Battle at Chignecto on 3 September, 1750.

During the 1751 raid on Dartmouth (also referred to as the Dartmouth Massacre) on 13 May, 1751, Miꞌkmaq warriors and Acadian militia under the command of Acadian Joseph Broussard, raided Dartmouth, Nova Scotia, destroying the town and killing twenty British villagers and wounding British regulars. Captain Clapham and his company of 60 rangers were stationed on Blockhouse Hill. He and the company are reported to have remained within the blockhouse firing from the loop-holes during the whole raid. A court martial was called on 14 May, the day after the raid, to inquire into the conduct of the commanding officers who allowed the village to be destroyed. In June, Clapham's sergeant was acquitted.

Prosecution for homicide, 1751 

In 1751, Clapham was prosecuted in Halifax for killing a drunk prisoner by gagging him too tightly. The case was unique in that Clapham was not brought before a court martial, but was instead tried in a civilian court.

The outcome of the case is not recorded.

Divorce, 1754 

Following his service in Nova Scotia, Clapham returned to Boston to face divorce proceedings. Records for the Massachusetts House of Representatives for 17 October, 1754, show a "special act" in the case of Mary Clapham v. William Clapham, sponsored in part by James Otis Sr., dissolving their marriage contract, after William Clapham stood convicted of "leaving the said Mary, cohabiting and committing Adultery with Another Woman in Nova Scotia." The act allowed Mary to marry again, and the council later awarded Mary her household furniture, worth £100.

Promotion to colonel, 1756 

Clapham then moved to Pennsylvania to assist Benjamin Franklin in constructing a series of forts along the frontier. In late 1755, Governor Robert Hunter Morris ordered the construction of forts garrisoned with colonial militia, and plans were made to begin building Fort Hunter, Fort Halifax, and Fort Augusta. Clapham was promoted from captain to colonel in February, 1756, and given command over the Third Battalion, Pennsylvania Regiment of Foot (known as the Augusta Regiment), and over defenses in Northampton County.

Fort Hunter 

The Pennsylvania government decided to construct a fort at Hunter's Mill in response to the Penn's Creek Massacre in October 1755. The mill was probably five hundred feet east of the mouth of Fishing Creek, near its confluence with the Susquehanna River, in present-day Dauphin County. Fort Hunter was initially a stockaded gristmill in the Great Valley, owned by Samuel Hunter who lived on Fishing Creek. The mill was fortified with a simple stockade in January, 1756, and garrisoned with volunteer militia recruited by Thomas McKee, an Indian trader who operated a trading post nearby. He was appointed captain of "McKee's Volunteers," but provisions, clothing and ammunition were in short supply, and the post was vulnerable to attack.

On 8 March, 1756, Benjamin Franklin wrote to August Gottlieb Spangenberg that:

"We are apt to think, that the Guarrison in the Forts, after being a little more used to the Woods, and acquainted with the cunning Contrivances of the Savages, will be more diligent and successful, in ranging of the Woods; especially if Col. Clapham, who is reckond a very vigilant Gentleman, should soon come up again."

On 7 April, 1756, Governor Morris ordered Clapham to march his regiment to Hunter's Mill to begin construction.<ref name = "Carr">[http://paheritage.wpengine.com/article/digging-fort-hunters-history/ James Herbstritt, Janet Johnson and Kurt Carr, "Digging Fort Hunter’s History," Pennsylvania Heritage," Fall 2011]</ref> On 11 May, 1756, McKee handed over command of the fort to Colonel Clapham. The fort probably consisted of a block house surrounded by a defensive ditch. There are references in historic documents to a stockade and to the construction (in January, 1757) of "a Room for the Officers & Barracks for the Soldiers...in Hunters Fort." It was described as having "a commanding view of the river." Fort Halifax was 160 feet wide with bastions, so Fort Hunter was likely similar in construction, but no drawings or plans exist. 

The fort was abandoned and fell into ruins after 1763. The community of Fort Hunter, Pennsylvania was established nearby after 1787.

 Dispute with Governor Morris 

Clapham's temperament was revealed in May, 1756, when he and several officers stayed with Governor Robert Morris at Harris's Ferry, operated by John Harris Sr. and the future site of Harrisburg, Pennsylvania. Captain Joseph Shippen later wrote to his father that Governor Morris had made some remarks which offended Clapham, so that Clapham refused to speak to the governor for several days afterward, and eventually saddled his horse with intent to ride away and abandon his troops. Captain Shippen and other officers persuaded Clapham not to leave, and were able to mediate a reconciliation between the two men. Historian William Albert Hunter comments on this event that:
"The Colonel [Clapham] was an obvious target for criticism; a New Englander, self-important in manner, somewhat arbitrary in action, sometimes intemperate in speech, he easily found adversaries who preferred to regard him as a person of limited accomplishments who had risen above his proper station."

 Fort Halifax 

On 5 June, 1756, Clapham left Fort Hunter with five companies, marching north along the Susquehanna River to select a suitable location for Fort Halifax. He picked a site near a large stand of pines which he planned to use for construction, close to a water-powered sawmill on Armstrong Creek. In a June 11 letter to Governor Morris, Clapham noted that the site he chose for the fort was appropriate because of "...the vast Plenty of Pine Timber at Hand, its nearness to Shamokin and a Saw within a Quarter of a Mile." In later correspondence he mentions the complete absence of roads along the river.Fort Halifax Park The Lenape village of Shamokin had been abandoned a few weeks earlier.

On 10 June, Clapham held a conference with Oghaghradisha, an Iroquois chief, at Clapham's military camp. Oghaghradisha presented Clapham with a wampum belt and gave Clapham the Iroquois name "Ugcarumhiunth." He told Clapham that 
"The Iroquois living on the North Branch of Sasquehanna have lent me as a representative of the whole, to treat with you and will ratify all my contracts. Brother, they agree to your building a Fort at Shamokin, but are desirous that you should also build a Fort three days journey, in a canoe, higher up, the North Branch, in their country, at a place called "Adjouquay" (present-day Pittston, Pennsylvania). If you agree to my proposals in behalf of my nation, I will return and immediately collect our whole force to be employed in protecting your people while you are building a fort in our country...The land is troubled, and you may justly apprehend danger, but if you will grant our request we will be together, and if any danger happens to you, we will share it with you."

Fort Halifax was a stockade fort  square, with four bastions and surrounding earthworks about 10 feet high. Once finished, it was garrisoned by Pennsylvania Colonial Militia and served as the chief supply post between the area settlements and Shamokin where Fort Augusta would be built later that summer. 

The fort was abandoned in late 1757, and was dismantled in mid-1763.

 Fort Augusta

 

In June, 1756, Major James Burd finally received sufficient funding and supplies to begin building Fort Augusta at the former site of the Native American village of Shamokin. Colonel Clapham arrived in late June with men and material to start construction. However, he and his men were dissatisfied when the Commissary General, James Young, arrived in mid-July to deliver their pay, much of which had been withheld. Young wrote to Governor Morris on 18 July:
"At Shamokin the people are extremely uneasy for their pay. The Colonel is highly displeased [that] I had not orders to pay him for his Captain's commission, likewise that I brought no money to pay the Battoe men; he talks loudly of his ill usage and threatens to leave the service; that he will go and join the Six Nations, whether they side with the English or the French."

On 5 August, 1756, Edward Shippen III wrote to his son, Colonel Joseph Shippen, at Shamokin: "You tell me the Colonel [Clapham] frequently says he will soon resign and go to Philadelphia."

Clapham had largely completed Fort Augusta by late August 1756. Named for Augusta of Saxe-Gotha, the mother of King George III, it was the largest British fort built in Pennsylvania, with earthen walls more than two hundred feet long topped by wooden fortifications.James Herbstritt, Janet Johnson and Kurt Carr, "Digging Fort Hunter’s History," Pennsylvania Heritage, Fall 2011 The fort was garrisoned by sixteen officers and 337 men and had twelve cannons and two swivel guns. It served as base for the Third Battalion, Pennsylvania Regiment of Foot, known as the Augusta Regiment, which was originally formed to build and garrison Fort Augusta.

Clapham was concerned that the fort would be vulnerable to French assault from the west, if the French were to deploy artillery. On 7 September, 1756, he wrote to Franklin requesting permission to hire another carpenter for additional fortification of the fort's walls:
"If the Government designs to strengthen this Post by doubling the Fort with another Case of Logs and filling up the intermediate Space with Earth in order to render it Cannon Proof which I think ought to be done."

On 8 September, 1756, he wrote to Franklin requesting additional supplies and horses:
"This Post, which is in my Opinion of the utmost Consequence to the Province, is already defensible against all the Power of Musquetry, but as it is from the Nature of its Situation expos’d to a more formidable Descent from the West Branch [of the Susquehanna River. It ought I think to be render’d still stronger, for which Purpose a greater Number of Horses and Teams are necessary. ’Tis likewise expedient that this Garrison should be supply’d with at least Six Month’s Provisions and Stores equivalent."

In late 1756, several hundred French and Native American troops traveled down the Great Shamokin Path to destroy the fort. This raiding party had been gathered from the French posts at Fort Duquesne, Venango, and Fort Le Boeuf, and the Lenape village of Kittanning, and had assembled at the mouth of Anderson Creek, where they built bateaux to descend the Susquehanna River, bringing with them two or three small brass cannons. They observed Fort Augusta from a distance, then withdrew after deciding that it was too well defended.

On 4 November, 1756, Colonel Clapham ordered a raid on Great Island (Lock Haven, Pennsylvania) to destroy the Indians there, who formerly lived at Shamokin and were reportedly under French influence. On 8 December, Major James Burd took command of the fort.

The fort's garrison was evacuated in June, 1765, but an Indian trading post remained in operation. The fort was later used during the Revolutionary War, 1778-1780, after which it was abandoned. It was dismantled in 1796.

 Resignation, 1757 

Clapham resigned his command of the garrison in March, 1757. He was evidently an unpopular commander, as suggested by Edward Shippen III in a letter to Major James Burd on 26 March, 1757:
"I congratulate you on the good news: Col. Clapham has resigned, (so Doctor Shippen says,) and if he is pleased you have no cause to be displeased, I am sure. I never doubted his skill in fighting Indians, nor his natural disposition to quarrel with and abuse all mankind. It was always my opinion, that...he was unfit to command a batallion belonging to the king of England."

On 5 April, Shippen wrote again to Major Burd, commenting on the news that Clapham intended to become a fur trader:
"I am glad you have got so well rid of Clapham as your Colonel, and if the poor fellow should desire a license to set up his trade at your camp, I hope you will grant him the favor; for though he did not understand the business of a commandant, yet he can bring credentials from the Carbuncle, alias Rednosed Club, in Boston, of his skill in hat making; and as he was well recommended by my countrymen as a good wood-ranger, he can never be at a loss for materials to make up...For a man who had not cunning enough to keep a ball at his foot which turned him ~365 per annum, could not be expected to outwit foxes, beavers, and such other sagacious creatures."

 Pittsburgh census, 1761 

After assisting in the establishment of frontier forts, Clapham retired from the army and moved to Pittsburgh in 1760. On 14 April, 1761, Clapham published the first census of the population of Pittsburgh, conducted under the direction of Colonel Henry Bouquet, in which he recorded 104 houses and a total population of 332 people, composed of 95 officers, soldiers, and their families, and 238 civilians.

 Trading post 

Soon afterwards, Clapham entered into an economic venture with Indian trader George Croghan to develop a trading post and a settlement, later referred to as Oswegly Old Town.Dixon, David. Never Come to Peace Again: Pontiac's Uprising and the Fate of the British Empire in North America. Norman: University of Oklahoma Press, 2014. 
In 1762, he applied for the right to settle on land 18 miles southeast of Fort Pitt, which he had purchased from George Croghan, and his application was approved by Colonel Bouquet and General Robert Monckton. Clapham cleared his land in February, 1763, and subsequently operated a trading post and extensive plantation where Sewickley Creek enters into the Youghiogheny River (between present-day Sutersville, Pennsylvania and West Newton, Pennsylvania). He and Croghan planned to sell corn, hay, and cattle at Fort Pitt. He was a well known and respected figure on the trans-Appalachian frontier in Pennsylvania, but unlike his associate George Croghan, he was not trusted by the Ohio Valley tribes.

Death and burial, 1763

Clapham's Trading Post was the site of the first attack in Pennsylvania of Pontiac's Rebellion. On 28 May, 1763, Keekyuscung, his son Wolf, and two other Indians allegedly murdered and scalped Clapham, his wife and child at Clapham's farm on Sewickley Creek. This was reportedly done in retaliation for the destruction of a Lenape community at Great Island (Lock Haven, Pennsylvania), ordered by Clapham in November, 1756. Wolf may also have been seeking revenge for having been arrested and imprisoned at Fort Pitt in 1762 on charges of horse theft. He had escaped and plotted his revenge together with his father. After the massacre, a war belt was returned to Pontiac’s allied tribes in other regions of Pennsylvania and soon these tribes would lay siege to Fort Pitt.

William Trent, then Superintendent of Fort Pitt, wrote on 29 May:

"At Break of day this Morning three Men came from Col. Clapham's who was settled at the Oswegly Old Town about 25 Miles from here on the Youghyogeane River, with an account that Col. Clapham, with one of his Men, two women and a child were Merdered by Wolfe and some other Delaware Indians, about two o'clock the day before...The women that were killed at Col. Clapham's were treated in such a brutal manner that Decency forbids the Mentioning." 

An article in the Pennsylvania Gazette on 31 May stated:

"There is most melancholy news here, the Indians have broke out in divers Places and have murdered Colonel Chapman (sic) and his Family; and two of our Men at the Saw-Mill just by the Ford, and scalps taken off each Man."

On 2 May, 1764, Colonel Henry Bouquet drew up a series of demands on Native American tribes with whom he was negotiating for peace as part of the 1764 Treaty of Fort Niagara, including "that they deliver up the murderers of Clapham...to be put to death for their Crimes."

William Clapham is buried in the cemetery at Trinity Cathedral in Pittsburgh.

 In popular culture 

There is a reference to "Captain Clapham" in an early version of the song Yankee Doodle'', printed in an undated broadside titled “The Recruiting Officer, Together with Yanky Doodle,” probably published between 1748 and before Clapham completed his service in Canada in 1754:

Here's Father and I, for Canady,
Likewise another Brother,
And Seven more we leave on shore,
For to take Care of Mother.
Tho' I am young I do belong,
To valiant Captain Clapham,
I'll run my Chance and fight the French,
And that’s the Way we’ll nab 'em.

See also 

 Father Le Loutre's War
 Raid on Dartmouth (1751)
 Fort Hunter
 Fort Halifax
 Fort Augusta

External links 

 In the Shadow of the King: Pontiac Stands Against the Tide of British Empire. Amateur archaeology finds in the area of Clapham's trading post.
 Maps of 18th century forts in Pennsylvania, including Fort Hunter, Fort Halifax, and Fort Augusta.

References 

1722 births
1763 deaths
British America army officers
People of Father Le Loutre's War
Forts in Pennsylvania
Military history of Nova Scotia
Military history of Pennsylvania
People of Pennsylvania of Pontiac's War
Military personnel from Massachusetts
People from Boston
1763 murders in North America
American murder victims
Colonial forts in Pennsylvania
French and Indian War forts